Phyllonorycter mongolicae is a moth of the family Gracillariidae. It is known from the islands of Hokkaidō, Honshū, Kyūshū and Shikoku in Japan.

The wingspan is 5.5–7 mm.

The larvae feed on Quercus crispula, Quercus mongolica and Quercus serrata. They mine the leaves of their host plant. The mine has the form of a ptychonomous blotch mine on the underside of the leaf.

References

mongolicae
Moths of Japan
Moths described in 1963